Vivian El Jaber is an Argentine actress.

Awards

Wins
 2013 Martín Fierro Awards
 Best secondary actress (for Farsantes)

References

Argentine actresses
Living people
Year of birth missing (living people)